Wetmore House, also known as the Warren County Historical Society, is a historic home located at Warren, Warren County, Pennsylvania.  It was built between 1870 and 1873, and is a two-story, red brick mansion in the Second Empire style.  It has a mansard roof and small, one-story open portico.  It was acquired by the Warren County Historical Society in 1964.

It was added to the National Register of Historic Places in 1975.

References

External links
Warren County Historical Society website

History museums in Pennsylvania
Houses on the National Register of Historic Places in Pennsylvania
Second Empire architecture in Pennsylvania
Houses completed in 1873
Houses in Warren County, Pennsylvania
National Register of Historic Places in Warren County, Pennsylvania
Buildings and structures in Warren, Pennsylvania
Museums in Warren County, Pennsylvania